Baghestan (also Romanized as Bāghestān; also known as Gūjū) is a village in Kharturan Rural District, Beyarjomand District, Shahrud County, Semnan Province, Iran. At the 2006 census, its population was 108, in 28 families.

References 

Populated places in Shahrud County